Christian Zervos (Argostoli, Cefalonia, Greece, January 1, 1889 – September 12, 1970, Paris) was a Greek-French art historian, critic, collector, writer and publisher.

Better known as an art critic in his own right, Zervos founded the magazine Cahiers d'art (1926–1960) in Paris, and ran an art gallery.

He was a connoisseur of modern painting in his time, and of Greek art and prehistoric art.  He published several books, of which the most important are: The Art of Crete, The Art of the Cyclades, L'art de l'époque du Renne en France, and a catalogue raisonné of the work of Pablo Picasso.

M. Christian Durquet, Conservator of Patrimony at the Musée de l'Art Contemporain, ordered the establishment of a Zervos Museum at Vézelay.

Salvador Dalí once credited him with being the 'most mediocre person that ever existed.'

Publications 

 
Raoul Dufy, éditions Cahiers d'art, 1928
 Catalogue raisonné des œuvres de Pablo Picasso, éditions Cahiers d'art, Paris, 1932-1978
 Art de la Mésopotamie, éditions Cahiers d'art, 1935
 Matthias Grünewald : le retable d'Isenheim, éditions Cahiers d'art, 1936
 Art de la Catalogne, éditions Cahiers d'art, 1937
 Histoire de l'art contemporain, éditions Cahiers d'art, 1938
 Dessins de Picasso, éditions Cahiers d'art, 1949
 Fernand Léger : œuvres de 1905 à 1952, éditions Cahiers d'art, 1952
 Civilisation de la Sardaigne : néolithique au nouragique, éditions Cahiers d'art, 1954
 L'art des Cyclades, du début à la fin de l'âge du bronze, 2500-1100 avant notre ère, éditions Cahiers d'art, 1957
 Corpora, éditions Cahiers d'art, 1957
 Chauvin, éditions Cahiers d'art, 1960
 Brâncuși, éditions Cahiers d'art, 1957

Bibliography 

- Index général de la revue Cahiers d'art, 1926-1960, pref. Dora Vallier, Paris, Ed. Cahiers d'art, 1981.

- Chara Kolokytha, Formalism and Ideology in 20th century Art: Cahiers d'Art, magazine, gallery, publishing house (1926-1960), PhD thesis, Northumbria University, 2016.

- Chara Kolokytha, 'The Art Press and Visual Culture in Paris during the Great Depression: Cahiers d'Art, Minotaure and Verve' in: Visual Resources, An International Journal of Documentation 3, vol.29, Sept. 2013, pp. 184–215.

- Chara Kolokytha, 'Christian Zervos et Cahiers d'art, Archives de la Bibliothèque Kandinsky' in Konsthistorisk Tidskrift 4, vol. 82, 2013, pp. 339–342.
Polina Kosmadaki (ed.),

- "Christian Zervos & Cahiers d’art: the archaic turn", exhibition catalogue, Benaki Museum, Athens, 2019. 327 p. with texts by P. Kosmadaki, Alexandre Farnoux, Panayotis Tournikiotis, Eleni Stavroulaki, Christian Derouet.

- Jean-Pierre De Rycke,  "Christian Zervos et Tériade: deux insulaires grecs à la conquête de l'avant-garde européenne", Paris - Athènes, 1863 - 1940, Pinacothèque Nationale et Musée Alexandros Soutzos. Athènes, 2006.

- Kim Grant, "Cahiers d'Art and the Evolution of Modernist Painting", The Journal of Modern Periodical Studies, v. 1, n. 2, 2010, pp. 216–227.

- Cahiers d'art, Musée Zervos à Vézelay, sous la direction de Christian Derouet, Paris, Hazan, Perrigny, Conseil général de l'Yonne, DL 2006.

-Christopher Green, "Zervos, Picasso and Brassaï, ethnographers in the field: a critical collaboration", in Malcolm Gee (ed.) Art criticism since 1900,  Manchester University Press, 1993.

- Valery Dupont, Le discours anthropologique dans l'art des années 1920-1930 en France, à travers l'exemple des Cahiers d'art, thèse, 1999, Art et Archéologie, Université de Dijon.

References

External links 
 http://www.fondationzervos.com (French)
 http://www.musee-zervos.fr
 https://www.benaki.org/index.php?option=com_events&view=event&type=&id=5976&lang=en

1889 births
1970 deaths
French book publishers (people)
French art critics
Greek emigrants to France
Greek art collectors
People from Argostoli
French male non-fiction writers
20th-century French male writers